The Island Mountain Railway (Santa Catalina Island Incline Railway, or Angel's Flight) was a funicular railway at the resort town of Avalon on Santa Catalina Island, off the coast of California. The railway was unique because it not only ran from Avalon's amphitheater to the top of a nearby mountain but it also ran down the mountain's other side to Lovers' Cove. At the time of the railroad's operation Santa Catalina Island was a popular seaside destination. The railway opened in 1904 and closed in 1918, reopening in 1921 and closing again in 1923.

A single car carried passengers up from the amphitheater in Avalon to the top of the hill overlooking Avalon. A second car ran down the other side of the hill to Pebble Beach, in Lover's Cove.

See also
 List of funicular railways

References

Defunct funicular railways in the United States
Transport infrastructure completed in 1904
Rail transportation in California
Defunct California railroads
Railway inclines in the United States
1904 establishments in California
1923 disestablishments in California